(), referred as  prior to the Han dynasty,  and , and sometimes referred as apron in English even though they are not apron as defined in the English dictionary, is a generic term which refers to the Chinese skirts used in , especially those worn as part of , and in . The  continued to exist even in the Republic of China. Several forms of ancient-style  regained popularity in the 21st century following the Hanfu movement; this also inspired the development of new styles of qun with modern aesthetics and shapes.

Terminology 
In a broad sense, the Chinese character 《》is a synonym for the word ; both of these are generic words for skirts in China.

In ancient China, the Chinese character 《》can refer to "lower garments," which included both the trousers called  and the  skirt also called  which also use the same character《裳》. The term  with the Chinese character《》also referred to skirt . The  also explains that the term  which uses the character《帬》is the same as the term  which uses the characters《 》.

The  is a generic term which refers to unlined skirts. The  is a generic term which typically refer to a form of inner skirt.

History 

Warring states period and Qin dynasty 
In the Warring States period, men could also wear short skirts similar to a kilt.

Han dynasty 
The  first appeared in the Eastern Han dynasty. According to the story, however, the wearing of short skirts with pleats first appeared in the Western Han dynasty when Feng Wufang saved Zhao Feiyan from falling; but while saving her, her skirt had been ripped. This led to the creation of a long excessively pleated-style , called , which was inspired by the ripped skirt of Zhao Feiyan and became popular.

Song dynasty 

Yuan dynasty 
The  continued to be worn in the Yuan dynasty.

Qing dynasty 
The  continued to be worn in the Qing dynasty. In this period, the  worn by the Han Chinese were often  which featured pleats and embroideries at the panels and decorative borders. The late Qing dynasty  were also heavier compared to those worn in the earlier times as they were weighted by the embroideries and pleats.

Republic of China 
During the early period of the Republic of China, people in Beijing continued to wear the clothing worn in the Qing dynasty.

Types and styles in  
The  can also have specific names based on the styles, design and constructions, the number of pleats and colours. In other dynasties, the  could be tied at the waist level.

and  

It was most often found with a belt attached to it; however some women preferred to use a separate belt.

This form of  also had a waist belt which was sewed at the upper part of the skirt and both ends of the waist belt would extend to form the ties.

() are a form of  made of alternative strips of fabric of two different colours sewn together. Its structure can be traced back to the late Northern Wei dynasty and continued to be used until the Five dynasties and Ten kingdoms period. This form of skirt was high-waist during the Sui and the Tang dynasties and were characteristics clothing for women during this time period. The evolution process of the  reflects the multiculturalism context, the cultural exchange, and the cultural integration which occurred between the Han Chinese, the northern ethnic minority culture, and the culture of the Western regions which occurred from the late Northern Wei dynasty to the Sui and Tang dynasties.

Pleated skirts are called .

is a form of wrap-around skirt which was tied at the waist level; it consisted of over 100 pleats in numbers. Each pleats were fixed to the waistband of the skirt and each pleats had the same width.

and its variant 

The  was a wrap-around skirt composed of two overlapping panels of fabric which was tied at the waist level. It was characterized with a flat front and pleats on the two sides.

The  could typically vary in colour; however, red and green were the most common colours used. The  was typically paired with the  jacket.

The  was a red skirt which was especially popular in the Tang dynasty.

Imperial and court attire

Types and styles in  

 : a skirt which has the shape of a tube; it is often worn as outer-skirt being worn over an inner skirt, which could be pleated skirt.

Similar forms 
 Chima – Korean equivalent

See also 

 Hanfu
 List of Hanfu

Notes

References 

Hanfu
Chinese traditional clothing
Skirts